Timbarra River, a mostly perennial stream of the Clarence River catchment, is located in the Northern Tablelands district of New South Wales, Australia.

Course and features
Timbarra River rises on the slopes of Gibraltar Range, east of Bald Nob, and flows generally north northeast, joined by four minor tributaries before reaching its confluence with the Clarence River, south southwest of Tabulam. The river descends  over its  course; and flows through the Gibraltar Range National Park in its upper reaches. Between Tenterfield and Grafton, the course of Timbarra River flows adjacent to the Bruxner Highway.

See also

 Rivers of New South Wales

References

 

Rivers of New South Wales
Northern Tablelands